The 2022–23 season is the 103rd in the history of SC Heerenveen and their 30th consecutive season in the top flight. The club will participate in Eredivisie and the KNVB Cup.

Players

On loan

Transfers

Pre-season and friendlies

Competitions

Overall record

Eredivisie

League table

Results summary

Results by round

Matches 
The league fixtures were announced on 17 June 2022.

KNVB Cup

References

SC Heerenveen seasons
Heerenveen